Pavel "Pasha" Kovalev is a Russian professional Latin and ballroom dancer.

Kovalev started dancing at the age of eight, and in 2001, moved to the United States with his professional dance partner Anya Garnis. In 2007, the couple competed on the third season of the American version of So You Think You Can Dance, and they have since participated in the eight subsequent seasons as either choreographers or All-Star partners to the contestants.

In 2011, Kovalev moved to the United Kingdom to take part in the BBC's Strictly Come Dancing as a professional dancer. After finishing runner-up on both the ninth and tenth series with celebrity partners Chelsee Healey and Kimberley Walsh, he went on to win series twelve with his partner Caroline Flack. Despite facing backlash over her past dance experience and landing in the bottom two three times, he and his celebrity partner, Ashley Roberts, later became runners-up on the sixteenth series of the show. They currently hold the record of the highest average for any celebrity on the show – with an average of 36.9 – and another record for scoring the most perfect scores – with a total of five. Kovalev announced that 2018 was his final series on the show as he had decided to "find a new challenge" after "eight incredible years".

Early life and competitive career
He began dancing at the age of eight, and until 2000, he competed with his partner Anya Garnis in the Amateur Latin category in Russia.

After moving to the US, Kovalev and Garnis turned professional and from 2002 started competing in the United States, the United Kingdom and Canada. Their competitive achievements include being finalists in the US Open from 2002 to 2006.

So You Think You Can Dance
In 2007, Kovalev and Garnis auditioned for season 3 of the US reality show So You Think You Can Dance. Garnis made it to the Top 12 stage, whereas Kovalev made it all the way to the Semi-Finals. The pair have since participated in all following seasons as either choreographers or as All-Stars.

Season 3: Contestant

Although originally he only attended the audition to support Anya Garnis, he was asked to audition as well and together with Garnis became one of the 20 dancers chosen to compete in the show's third season from June to August 2007.

After making it all the way to the Top 6, Kovalev was eliminated on 13 August, in the last round before the final, losing out to the two remaining males, contemporary dancers Danny Tidwell and Neil Haskell. Sabra Johnson, the remaining female contemporary dancer, went on to win the competition. Kovalev and Garnis both later took part in the So You Think You Can Dance Tour.

Seasons 4–11: Choreographer

On Season 4, Kovalev assisted Mia Michaels on a Contemporary routine, and he and his partner Anya Garnis choreographed a Cha-Cha routine performed by Courtney Galiano and Gev Manoukian.

On Season 5, Kovalev and Garnis choreographed a Samba for Evan Kasprzak and Randi Evans.

On Season 6, he and Garnis returned to So You Think You Can Dance to lead the choreography rounds during the auditions, and later that season choreographed a Jive for Russell Ferguson and Mollee Gray.

Kovalev was announced as an "All-Star" for both Season 7 and Season 8 of the show, performing all the Latin and Ballroom dances with the female finalists, including winners Lauren Froderman and Melanie Moore.

For Season 9, the following year, he returned to choreograph a Cha-cha routine for contestants Janelle Issis and Dareian Kujawa on the third week of live shows.

Finally, on 16 July 2014, Kovalev returned with Garnis to choreograph a new Jive routine for contestants Bridget Whitman and Emilio Dosal during Season 11.

Strictly Come Dancing

In September 2011, Kovalev joined BBC's Strictly Come Dancing as the new professional dancer of its ninth series, replacing Jared Murillo who had left after only one series with the BBC programme. He has since reached the finals three out of five series, finishing runner-up on his first and second series, and winning on his fourth.

Statistics and Strictly records

As a Strictly professional dancer, Kovalev holds the record for most perfect scores, with a total of 13. He was also the second dancer to reach the finals three times (after Brendan Cole) as the runner up of Series 9 and 10, and the winner of Series 12.

Along with his Series 12 partner the late Caroline Flack and Series 16 partner Ashley Roberts, Kovalev holds the record for the longest consecutive run of perfect scores, after scoring a 40 for each of their last four dances.  Flack and Kovalev were also the first to receive a perfect score for all three of their dances in the final.
With Roberts, Kovalev holds the record for most maximum scores of 40, by any couple, with five.

Key
 Winner of the series
 Runner-up of the series
 Non finalist
 First elimination of the series
 Participating

Kovalev has received the highest score in the history of Strictly Come Dancing for ten of the show's eighteen dance styles and is the first Strictly professional dancer to receive a perfect score for the Paso Doble and also for the Tango. Furthermore, he has received a ten from at least one of the judges for all of the show's dance styles, except the Waltz.

He holds the record for the highest score ever awarded to the Paso Doble and the Rumba, with Series 9 partner Chelsee Healey; to the Charleston and the Tango, with Series 10 partner Kimberley Walsh; to the Salsa, the Cha Cha Cha, the Charleston and the Showdance, with Series 12 partner Caroline Flack; and to the Jive, the American Smooth, the Salsa, the Showdance and the Charleston with Series 16 partner Ashley Roberts. Kovalev and Walsh also received the only perfect score for the Series 10 Fusion dance, dancing to a mashup of the Cha Cha Cha and the Tango.

Highest and lowest scoring performances per dance

Scores earned on Christmas or any other specials are not included;
Green and Red numbers indicate the scores that were the best and worst per dance in Strictly history;
Kovalev received an additional perfect score (40) for a Fusion dance of the Cha Cha Cha and Tango with Series 10 partner Kimberley Walsh.

Number of tens received per dance between series 9 and 16

10s earned on Christmas or any other specials are not included;
Kovalev received 4 additional 10s for a Fusion dance of the Cha Cha Cha and Tango with Series 10 partner Kimberley Walsh.

All marks received per dance between series 9 and 16

Marks earned on Christmas or any other specials are not included;
 * This style of dance was introduced for one series only and was performed as a mashup of the Cha Cha Cha and Tango on Week 10 of Series 10, receiving a perfect score from the judges.

Series 9: Chelsee Healey

In the ninth series, his first, Kovalev was partnered with Waterloo Road actress, Chelsee Healey.

The couple received the only perfect score ever awarded for the Paso Doble and made it all the way to the finals, finishing as runners-up to Harry Judd and his partner Aliona Vilani.

Green number indicates Chelsee & Pasha were at the top of the leaderboard.
Red number indicates Chelsee & Pasha were at the bottom of the leaderboard.

Series 10: Kimberley Walsh

For the tenth series it was revealed that he would be dancing with Girls Aloud singer Kimberley Walsh.

The couple received the first perfect score ever awarded for the Tango and made it all the way to the finals, finishing as the runners-up to Olympic gymnast Louis Smith and his partner Flavia Cacace.

By coming second, Pasha became the first male professional dancer to reach two consecutive Strictly finals, and the third professional dancer to do so overall after Lilia Kopylova and Aliona Vilani.

Green number indicates Kimberley & Pasha were at the top of the leaderboard

Series 11: Rachel Riley

For the eleventh series, Kovalev was partnered with Countdown & The Gadget Show co-presenter, Rachel Riley.

During their time at the competition, the couple were never at the top or bottom of the leaderboard, and on Week 6, despite receiving their highest score of the series, they were eliminated after losing out in the dance-off to Abbey Clancy and Aljaž Skorjanec.

Series 12: Caroline Flack

For the twelfth series of the show in 2014, it was announced that Kovalev would partner former The Xtra Factor presenter, the late Caroline Flack.

The couple earned the first perfect 40 of the series for their salsa in the semi-finals, followed by an additional 3 in the finals giving them a perfect total of 120 points, a feat unmatched in the history of the competition. On 20 December 2014, the couple were crowned the champions of the series.

As the reigning Strictly champions, The couple performed their Salsa routine a second time during the launch show of Series 13.

Green number indicates Caroline & Pasha were at the top of the leaderboard

Series 13: Carol Kirkwood

For the Thirteenth series of the show in 2015, Kovalev returned as the reigning Strictly champion, and was paired up with BBC Breakfast weather presenter Carol Kirkwood.

Although the couple regularly landed at the bottom of the leaderboard, they successfully made it seven weeks without ever being in the bottom two. Kirkwood also set a record for joint lowest scoring Rumba on the show, tied with previous contestant Fiona Phillips, with just thirteen points out of a possible forty. On their seventh and final week, they were eliminated by EastEnders's Kellie Bright and Kevin Clifton in the dance off.

Red number indicates Carol & Pasha were at the bottom of the leaderboard

Series 14: Naga Munchetty

For series fourteen Kovalev was partnered with BBC news presenter Naga Munchetty. They were eliminated in week 4 against Anastacia and Brendan Cole in unanimous decision by the judges.

Series 15: Chizzy Akudolu

For series fifteen Kovalev was paired with British actress Chizzy Akudolu. They were the first couple eliminated after losing to Brian Conley and Amy Dowden in the first dance-off of the series, on 1 October 2017.

Series 16: Ashley Roberts

For Series 16, Kovalev was partnered with former The Pussycat Dolls singer, Ashley Roberts. The couple went on to become the highest scoring couple of all time.

The pair matched Kovalev's previous record, set in 2014 with his former partner Series 14 winner the late Caroline Flack, of scoring perfect 40s for all three dances in the final. They also set the records of achieving the most 40s during a series, with five, as well as the highest average score in the history of the series with 36.94.

They finished as joint runners-ups to winners Stacey Dooley and Kevin Clifton.

Score awarded by guest judge Alfonso Ribeiro *
Green number indicates Ashley & Pasha were at the top of the leaderboard

Other television appearances

In 2008, Kovalev and Garnis appeared on the sixth season of Dancing with the Stars in a results show performance, dancing to "Come On Over" by Jessica Simpson.

In early 2009 he again performed with Garnis on the international dance show Superstars of Dance, representing Russia in the duet category, but they were then replaced by another couple in the 19 January episode.

In early 2010, the pair guest-choreographed for the third season of So You Think You Can Dance Australia.

On 4 January 2013, Kovalev guest starred in the music video of "One Day I'll Fly Away", the lead single of Centre Stage,  his series 10 partner Kimberley Walsh's first solo album. Filming occurred on 4 January 2013 at Pinewood Studios, and the music video premiered on 17 January 2013. It features Walsh performing the song in different settings, until she is joined by Kovalev and they perform a ballet number.

In March 2013, ahead of Comic Relief's Red Nose Day 2013, comedian Miranda Hart took part in a Strictly Extravaganza, where she attempted to dance ballroom with Kovalev, as one of her five Miranda's Mad March challenges.

Strictly Come Dancing Children in Need Specials

On 18 November 2011, Kovalev took part in a Strictly BBC Newsreaders programme benefiting Children in Need, where he partnered with newsreader Emily Maitlis for a group dance.

In 2016, Kovalev was partnered with Olympic champion rower Helen Glover for the Strictly Come Dancing Children in Need Strictly Special, taking place on 18 November.

Key
 Winner of the special
 Non winner
 Participating

Sport Relief Does Strictly Come Dancing Specials

On 23 March 2012, Kovalev and his Strictly Series 9 partner Chelsee Healey took part in the Sport Relief 2012 Strictly Come Dancing Underwater special, in aid of Sport Relief, competing against winners Harry Judd and Aliona Vilani. After receiving even scores from the judges, the pair won the show due to head judge Len Goodman breaking the tie in their favour.

In 2014, during a Paralympian special for Sport Relief 2014, Kovalev was partnered with Paralympic gold medalist Hannah Cockroft. After performing a group dance with the other contestants, the couple was declared the winners by the judges.

Key
 Winner of the special
 Non winner
 Participating

Strictly Come Dancing Christmas Specials

In December 2012, Kovalev and Healey were partnered again for a Strictly Allstar group dance during the 2012 Strictly Come Dancing Christmas Special.

In December 2013, Kovalev was partnered with West End star Elaine Paige during the 2013 Strictly Christmas Special. The couple received a total of 39 points for their Cha-Cha, the highest score of the night, with only judge Len Goodman giving them a 9. They ultimately lost to comedian Rufus Hound after a vote by the studio audience.

In December 2015, the full lineup of the 2015 Christmas special featured six returning contestants, including four former champions, in a change to recent tradition. Kovalev was partnered with television and radio presenter Lisa Snowdon, who finished in third place in the sixth series of the show. The pair earned 37 points from the judges for a Quickstep to "Let It Snow!", but eventually lost to series 9 winner Harry Judd.

The celebrity lineup of the 2016 Christmas special, which like the previous year, featured six returning contestants, was announced on 7 November 2016. Kovalev was partnered with New Zealand writer and actress Pamela Stephenson, and danced the Cha-Cha to "Jump" from the "Love Actually" soundtrack. The pair earned 39 points from the judges but lost to comedian Melvin Odoom.

The full line-up of the 2017 Christmas special, which features six returning contestants and their professional partners, was announced on 6 November 2017. Kovalev was partnered with ex-partner and Series 10 runner-up Kimberley Walsh and danced the Jive to "Run Rudolph Run". The pair earned 39 points from the judges, the highest score of the night, but lost to newscaster Katie Derham.

Key
 Winner of the special
 Non winner
 Participating

Performances and judges' scores

Green number indicates the couple was at the top of the judges' leaderboard.

Stage work

Burn the Floor

In August 2009, Kovalev and his partner Garnis joined the cast of Jason Gilkison's production Burn the Floor, one of the leading ballroom based shows in the world, during its stint on Broadway. The pair succeed departing Dancing with the Stars performers Maksim Chmerkovskiy and Karina Smirnoff.

Later in 2010, the pair joined the touring company of the show from 7 September to 28 November. Kovalev left the show in the summer of 2011 to join the BBC's Strictly Come Dancing.

Personal life

Kovalev and professional partner Anya Garnis started dating as teenagers in the late 1990s, after meeting in dance class in Siberia. In 2001, the couple moved to the United States together.

Kovalev started dating his former Strictly partner Rachel Riley in 2013, and the couple now live together in London. 
In May 2019, Riley and Kovalev announced via social media that they were expecting their first child in December. The couple subsequently married in Las Vegas on 28 June 2019. Their daughter was born on 15 December 2019. They welcomed their second daughter on 5 November 2021.

Live tours

2007: So You Think You Can Dance Live tour

In 2007, Kovalev headlined the So You Think You Can Dance Season 3 Live Tour, along with the other Top 10 contestants, visiting 50 cities in the United States.

Although eliminated in the Top 12 stage of the competition, his professional partner Anya Garnis was invited to take part as an alternate performer. The pair were able to perform together on the tour due to dancer Lacey Schwimmer needing a replacement in some of her routines because of an injury to her meniscus.

2012–2013: Strictly Come Dancing Live!

Kovalev took part in the Strictly Come Dancing Live! 2012 Tour with his celebrity partner Chelsee Healey from 20 January to 26 February, and was partnered with Series 10 finalist Dani Harmer on the 2013 Tour, starting 18 January 2013.

He didn't take part in the 2014 Tour with partner Rachel Riley, and the following year, he opted to focus on his own tour, with Tristan MacManus stepping in to partner with the late Caroline Flack during the 2015 Tour.

2012–2014: An evening with Katya and Pasha

Kovalev formed a new professional partnership with fellow Strictly professional Katya Virshilas. With their show An evening with Katya and Pasha they toured the UK from 27 March to 6 May 2012.

The couple reprised the tour in 2013, and finally in 2014.

2015: Life Through Dance

Beginning March 2015, Kovalev performed throughout Britain, with original partner Anya Garnis as his special guest, on his Life Through Dance Tour.

2016: It's All About You

Kovalev announced his 2016 It's All About You tour, including 74 shows from 18 March to 12 June. Professional partner Anya Garnis guest starred once again.

2020: Dancing With The Stars Weekend

Kovalev announced his appearance at Dancing With The Stars Weekend Friday 24th – Sunday 26 April 2020 at Celtic Manor Resort Hotel.

References

External links

Official Website

Living people
Russian male dancers
Russian ballroom dancers
So You Think You Can Dance choreographers
So You Think You Can Dance (American TV series) contestants
Strictly Come Dancing winners
People from Komsomolsk-on-Amur
Russian expatriates in the United Kingdom
Russian expatriates in the United States
21st-century American dancers
21st-century Russian dancers
Year of birth missing (living people)